UUP may refer to:

 Moscovium, an element formerly known as Ununpentium (Uup)
 Ulster Unionist Party, a political party in Northern Ireland
 United Utah Party, a political party in the United States
 Updated Airspace Use Plan (UUP), an air traffic control status message
 Invesco PowerShares (NYSE stock ticker symbol UUP)
 Royal Malaysian Police Air Wing Unit (Malay: Unit Udara PDRM (UUP))
 uup RNA motif